St. Mary's Forane Church is a Syro-Malabar church in Arakuzha village, 6 km from Muvattupuzha, India. The village has a large population of Nasrani Christians. These Nasrani Christians of Arakuzha have more than 1500 years of recorded history. The church is under the jurisdiction of  the Syro-Malabar Catholic Eparchy of Kothamangalam.
 Servant of God Mar Varghese Payyappilly Palakkappilly has served as the parish priest between 1920 and 1922.

History 

It was Rathappillil Muthi who erected the Marth Mariam Forane Church at Aarakzha. The church was pulled apart and rebuilt several times.

Daily Qurbana Timings

References
http://www.smcim.org/church/arakuzha/article/391 

Archdiocese of Ernakulam-Angamaly
Syro-Malabar Catholic church buildings
Christian organizations established in 1957
Roman Catholic dioceses and prelatures established in the 20th century
Religious organizations established in the 1640s
Eastern Catholic churches in Kerala
Churches in Ernakulam district
1957 establishments in Kerala